Terry Kent may refer to:

Terry Kent (canoeist) (born 1962), American canoeist
Terry Kent (footballer) (born 1939), British footballer